The East Timorese people mixed racially with Melanesian and Malay genetically. Most of the East Timorese population are Roman Catholic. 

East Timorese women usually have between 6 to 7 children on average, and based on a UN study, it was found that among those women that were between ages 20 to 24 almost more than half of them had at least one child, and of those, 60 percent had their first child before they were 19. A lot of the East Timorese women were teen mothers and dropped out of high school due to the responsibilities and pressure from having a child. In 2010 the government finally made a new policy that will focus on getting and keeping young mothers in school. This started with a sex education class and a whole transformation of the junior high school curriculum.

There are many rules women in East Timor follow for precaution to not be victims of sexual abuse such as: not being able to show their bare arms, wear low cut tops, short skirts or bikinis. Timorese women were also not allowed to go outside their living area alone, and if they were single they could not be seen alone with a man that is not related to them. The East Timorese women also are expected to be stay at home mothers and can not inherit or own their property.

Apart from these customary concepts, East Timorese women also confront domestic violence. Rape cases and sexual slavery were allegedly committed by East Timorese pro-integration militias during the September 1999 crisis in East Timor.  One of the organizations that promote empowerment and foster gender equality for the women of East Timor is the United Nations Development Fund for Women (UNIFEM). In 2010, a law was passed making domestic violence a public crime, but the practice remained prevalent nevertheless. In a 2009–10 Demographic and Health Survey, 36% of married women reported having experienced physical, psychological or sexual violence from their husband or partner, but only 24% reported discussing this with anyone and only 4% reported seeking help from the police. According to the same survey, 71% of men believe that the wife's neglecting children justifies the husband's beating her, while 72% of women believe that a husband is justified in beating his wife if she goes out without informing him. According to activists in non-governmental organizations such as Asisténsia Legál ba Feto no Labarik, domestic violence is severely under-reported and the punishments are not deterrent: in one case, a man who "stabbed his wife in the back of the head and struck her repeatedly with a block of wood, after an argument about feeding their children" only received a suspended jail sentence of seven months.

Sex trafficking

Citizen and foreign women and girls have been victims of sex trafficking in East Timor. They are raped and physically and psychologically harmed in brothels, hotels, homes, and other locations throughout the country.

Politics 

Women are active in East Timorese politics.

See also
East Timor Women Australia

References

Further reading
Martins da Silva, Mira and Susan Kendall. Issues for Women in East Timor: The Aftermath of Indonesian Occupation, February 18–22, 2002, University of Sydney, Australia
Violence against Women in Melanesia and East Timor: A Review of International Lessons, Office of Development Effectiveness, AusAID, Australian Government, 32 pages

External links

Status of Women in East Timor, AusAIDvideo, September 7, 2009

 
Women
East Timor